Zborów  is a village (Russian:зборовь) in the administrative district of Gmina Żelazków, within Kalisz County, Greater Poland Voivodeship, in west-central Poland.

References

Villages in Kalisz County